The MR 31 was a French nuclear warhead for the S2 medium-range ballistic missile.

It was apparently a pure plutonium device and unboosted, and the largest pure plutonium weapon ever built.

Entering service in August 1970 it was withdrawn from service by June 1980.

See also 
 force de frappe
 FOST
 nuclear tests by France

References

Nuclear warheads of France
Military equipment introduced in the 1970s